The Cycling at the 1965 Southeast Asian Peninsular Games was held between 15 September to 18 December. Cycling track were held at the Merdeka Stadium, Kuala Lumpur.

Medal summary

Men

Medal table

References

 https://eresources.nlb.gov.sg/newspapers/Digitised/Article/straitstimes19651216-1.2.119
 https://eresources.nlb.gov.sg/newspapers/Digitised/Article/straitstimes19651217-1.2.123.2
 https://eresources.nlb.gov.sg/newspapers/Digitised/Article/straitstimes19651218-1.2.125
 https://eresources.nlb.gov.sg/newspapers/Digitised/Article/straitstimes19651219-1.2.76

Southeast Asian Games
1965
1965 in track cycling
Events at the 1965 Southeast Asian Peninsular Games